Let Me Be Good to You is an album by the American R&B singer Lou Rawls, released in 1979 on Philadelphia International Records. 

The album's lead single, "Let Me Be Good to You", made #11 on the R&B chart, while the album itself peaked at #13 R&B. The album peaked at #49 on the pop chart.

Production
The production was split between Gamble & Huff, Thom Bell, Dexter Wansel and Jack Faith. New PIR signings the Jones Girls contributed backing vocals to the album.

Critical reception
AllMusic called Let Me Be Good to You "An above-average album that did much better than anyone thought it would at the time." The Bay State Banner thought that the album "again proves what a fine ballad and soul singer Rawls is," writing that "including one disastrous message song is the only thing that keeps this lp from being a complete triumph."

Track listing 
 "Time Will Take Care of Everything" (Kenny Gamble, Leon Huff) – 4:36
 "What's the Matter with the World?" (Gamble, Huff) – 5:55
 "Tomorrow" (Martin Charnin, Charles Strouse) – 3:59
 "We Keep Getting Closer to Being Farther Apart" (Lillian Lewis, Jack Perricone) – 4:11
 "Bark, Bite (Fight All Night)" (Thom Bell, LeRoy Bell, Casey James, Jack Robinson) – 4:28
 "Let Me Be Good to You" (Gamble, Huff) – 5:26
 "Lover's Holiday" (Dexter Wansel, Cynthia Biggs) – 5:20
 "Sweet Tender Nights" (Leroy Bell, James) – 3:39

Singles 
"Let Me Be Good to You" (US R&B #11)
"What's the Matter with the World" (did not chart)

References

Lou Rawls albums
Philadelphia International Records albums
1979 albums
Albums produced by Kenneth Gamble
Albums produced by Leon Huff
Albums produced by Thom Bell
Albums recorded at Sigma Sound Studios